The Beijing News is a Chinese Communist Party-owned newspaper from Beijing. The Chinese name of the newspaper is Xīn Jīng Bào, meaning "New Beijing News", which is a reference to the defunct Peking Gazette.

The Chinese publications serial number of the newspaper is CN11-0245.

History
The Beijing News began publishing on 11 November 2003 by a joint venture of Guangming Daily Press and Nanfang Media Group (also transliterated as "Southern Newspaper Group" or Southern Daily Press Group, publisher of Southern Weekly), both owned by the sub-committees of the Chinese Communist Party (CCP), the ruling party of China since 1949. Guangming Daily Press was owned by the Central Committee while Nanfang Media Group was owned by the Guangdong provincial committee of the CCP. Initially, staff from Nanfang Media Group dominated the day-to-day operation of the newspaper, turning The Beijing News into one of Beijing's most influential newspapers.

According to Jonathan Hassid, an assistant professor (from 2015 to 2018) at Iowa State University, the two publishers had different difficulties in their publishing business. Guangming Daily had a valuable central-level administrative rank but was the country poorest major publisher, while "Nanfang" had money to invest but its administrative rank was restricting the publisher to obtain new publication number or expand outside their home province Guangdong. According to another article by Congressional-Executive Commission on China, "the Guangming Daily consistently follows the Party's line, while the Southern Daily Press Group's  publications tend to be more commercially-oriented and willing to test Chinese censors".

In 2005, staff and online readers protested the sacking of the editors of the newspaper.

In July 2011, the newspaper defied the ban on reporting Wenzhou train collision. However, in the same month, the newspaper scrapped 9 pages of special reporting.

In 2013, it was reported that Dai Zigeng, a publisher of the newspaper, had verbally resigned due to political pressure from the propaganda authorities.

In 2014, it was reported that the Publicity Department had acquired the remaining 49% stake from Nanfang Media Group. According to the South China Morning Post, an English newspaper from Hong Kong, the general public were afraid that The Beijing News would be turned into a "propaganda mouthpiece". In February 2014, The Beijing News, made a news coverage regarding Zhou Yongkang's son possible corruption, but the article was taken down from the newspaper's website.

Beijing Morning Post ceased the publication in the same year.

See also
 Beijing Times, another Beijing newspaper, ceased publication in 2017
 Beijing Daily Group: a publishing group that was also owned by the Beijing Municipal Party Committee, the owner of The Beijing News. Beijing Daily Group publishes Beijing Morning Post as well as 8 other newspapers as of 2016, such as:
 Beijing Daily
 Beijing Evening News

References

External links

2003 establishments in China
Chinese-language newspapers (Simplified Chinese)
Chinese Communist Party newspapers
Newspapers published in Beijing
Publications established in 2003
Daily newspapers published in China